George Coats may refer to:

George Coats, 1st Baron Glentanar (1849–1918), Scottish cotton manufacturer
George Coats of Coats' disease

See also
George Coates
Coats (surname)